These are lists of radio stations in Taranaki in New Zealand.

Most Taranaki stations originate from New Plymouth and Hawera.

FM and AM stations New Plymouth

Low power FM stations

FM and AM stations outside of New Plymouth

References

Taranaki
Taranaki